Alexandru cel Bun is a commune in Neamț County, Western Moldavia, Romania. It was called Viișoara until 2002, when its name was changed. The commune is composed of seven villages: Agârcia, Bisericani, Bistrița, Scăricica, Vaduri, Vădurele and Viișoara (the commune center).

References

External links

Communes in Neamț County
Localities in Western Moldavia